The Moeraki Branch was one of the most short-lived railway lines in New Zealand.  It left the Main South Line between Oamaru and Dunedin and served Port Moeraki between 1877 and 1879.

Construction and operation

In 1873, English contractors John Brogden and Sons began constructing a 41.6 kilometre long section of the Main South Line, and their contract included a 2.47 kilometre branch to Port Moeraki.  In November 1876, a section of the Main South Line was opened from Oamaru to Hillgrove, and it was here that the Moeraki Branch left the main line.  It climbed down an unstable and steep hillside to the sea at Port Moeraki, with a viaduct necessitated.  The stability problems with the land became very evident when the viaduct had to be rebuilt before the line was even opened.  The line was finally finished and opened for use on 15 January 1877.  Trains ran daily every day of the week except Sundays.

Local interests envisaged that Port Moeraki, an old whaling station, would become the primary port for north Otago, but it could not compete with Oamaru, especially when a breakwater was installed in Oamaru, and stability problems plagued the railway line.  Services were regularly delayed by slips and it was not abnormal for the line to be closed for repairs.  The difficult terrain and Port Moeraki's diminished significance meant that the line's continued existence could not be justified and in October 1879, it was closed and the rails were removed.  Today, Port Moeraki is a small fishing village.

The branch today

Evidence of closed railways often diminishes or disappears entirely, so it is surprising that remnants of a line closed over a hundred years have actually been noted to still exist.  The embankment from which the branch curved away from the Main South Line is visible from both the railway and nearby road, and although obscured by vegetation, other embankments and cuttings can still be seen.  Remnants of the Millers Bay viaduct have so far survived the sea and can still be seen at the foot of the cliff beside which the railway once ran.  It is possible to walk along the formation of some of the branch's path.

Further reading 

 
 
 

Railway lines in New Zealand
Rail transport in Otago
Railway lines closed in 1879
Railway lines opened in 1877
Closed railway lines in New Zealand
1877 establishments in New Zealand